Knox Thompson (January 25, 1848 – March 19, 1894) was an American politician who served in the Virginia House of Delegates.

References

External links 

1848 births
1894 deaths
Democratic Party members of the Virginia House of Delegates
19th-century American politicians